Farewell Show - Live In London is the sixth and final live album by the band Delirious?. In November 2009, Delirious? attended the Hammersmith Apollo in London to record their final gig as a live concert album, DVD and Blu-ray in front of a sold-out crowd of 5,000. With this show they closed their "History Makers - Farewell Tour" which comprised 11 gigs in Germany, Austria, Switzerland, The Netherlands and the UK. The album was released on 19 April 2010.

Track listing
Disc 1
 "All This Time"
 "Bliss"
 "Solid Rock"
 "Sanctify"
 "Obsession"
 "Rain Down"
 "Deeper"
 "Paint the Town Red"
 "Inside Outside"
 "Majesty"
 "Our God Reigns"
 "Investigate"
 "History Maker"
 "My Soul Sings"

Disc 2: Cutting Edge Show
 "I'm Not Ashamed"
 "Happy Song"
 "Shout To the North"
 "Thank You for Saving Me" / "White Ribbon Day"
 "I Could Sing of Your Love Forever"
 "Find Me In the River"
 "Did You Feel the Mountains Tremble" / "Dance In the River"

References

Delirious? albums
2010 live albums
2010 video albums
Live video albums
Christian live video albums

pt:My Soul Sings